San Pedro, Spain may refer to the following places:

Inhabited places

Castile and León
Arenas de San Pedro, Ávila
Campo de San Pedro, Segovia
San Pedro del Arroyo Ávila
San Pedro Bercianos, León
San Pedro de Ceque, Zamora
San Pedro de Gaíllos, Segovia
San Pedro de Latarce, Valladolid
San Pedro Manrique, Soria
San Pedro de la Nave-Almendra, Zamora
San Pedro de Rozados, Salamanca
San Pedro del Valle, Salamanca
Torre Val de San Pedro, Segovia

Castile-La Mancha
Bascuñana de San Pedro, Cuenca
Peñas de San Pedro, Albacete
San Pedro, Albacete
San Pedro Palmiches, Cuenca

Other parts of Spain
San Pedro de Alcántara, Andalucia
San Pedro de Mérida, Badajoz, Extremadura
San Pedro del Pinatar, Spain, Murcia
San Pedro del Romeral, Cantabria
San Pedro de Torelló, Osona, Catalonia
San Pedro de Vilamajor, Barcelona, Catalonia
San Pedro, a parish of Viveiro, Lugo

Religious buildings
Abbey of San Pedro de Cardeña, Burgos, Castile and León
Church of San Pedro de Nora, Las Regueras
Co-Cathedral of San Pedro, Soria
Convento de San Pedro Mártir, Toledo, Castile-La Mancha
Monastery of San Pedro de Arlanza, Hortigüela, Burgos, Castile and León
San Pedro (Cordoba), a minor basilica
San Pedro Apóstol Church, La Línea de la Concepción, Andalusia
San Pedro de Roda, a former Benedictine monastery, Alt Empordà, Catalonia

Other uses
SD San Pedro, football team based in Sestao, Basque Country
Sierra de San Pedro, a mountain range, Extremadura
UD San Pedro, football team based in San Pedro de Alcántara, Andalusia

See also
San Pedro (disambiguation)